The Guadeloupe Rugby Committee (French: Comité de Rugby de Guadeloupe, —or officially: Comité Territorial de Rugby de Guadeloupe) is a committee under the umbrella of the French Rugby Federation which is the governing body for rugby union within Guadeloupe.

It is affiliated with the NACRA, which is the regional governing body for North America and the Caribbean, but it is not affiliated with the International Rugby Board (IRB) in its own right.

National teams

As an overseas department of France, Guadeloupe can participate in international competition, but not for the Rugby World Cup. Guadeloupe has thus far competed in the NACRA Caribbean Championship.

See also
 Rugby union in Guadeloupe
 Guadeloupe national rugby union team

External links
 Comité Territorial de Rugby de Guadeloupe on facebook.com
 Comité de Rugby de Guadeloupe on ASLagnyRugby.net

Reference list

Rugby union in Guadeloupe